Free and Easy is a 1930 American pre-Code comedy film starring Buster Keaton. It was Keaton's first leading role in a talking motion picture.

Plot
When small-town girl Elvira Plunkett (Anita Page) wins a contest that sends her to Hollywood, Los Angeles for a screen test at Metro-Goldwyn-Mayer (MGM), she is accompanied by her overbearing mother (Trixie Friganza) and Elmer J. Butts (Buster Keaton), a gas-station attendant who goes along as Elvira's manager. Elmer is secretly in love with Elvira, but on the train they meet MGM contract actor Larry Mitchell (Robert Montgomery), who falls for her as well, and has the connections to make her a star.

In Hollywood, Elmer manages to bungle his way through numerous films being shot on the MGM lot, disrupting production.  When given a screen test, he can't manage to say his one line correctly. Despite this, both he and Elvira's mother are given film contracts, and appear in a comic opera together.  Elmer wants to tell Elvira that he loves her, but hints at it in such a way that she mistakes it for advice on how to tell Larry that she loves him.

Cast
 Buster Keaton as Elmer
 Anita Page as Elvira
 Trixie Friganza as Ma Plunkett
 Robert Montgomery as Larry Mitchell
 Fred Niblo as himself
 Lionel Barrymore as director
 David Burton as himself
 William Haines as himself
 Marion Shilling (uncredited)
 Cecil B. DeMille as Director Cecil B. DeMille (uncredited)

Production
Free and Easy, whose working title was On the Set, was Buster Keaton's first starring role in a film shot for sound – he had appeared in MGM's talking The Hollywood Revue of 1929, but did not speak. As with his previous film for MGM, Spite Marriage, production on Free and Easy was largely out of Keaton's hands.

The film was used as a way to showcase MGM's stars and filmmakers, several of whom make cameos, including Cecil B. DeMille and Lionel Barrymore.  The film was shot in French, German, and Spanish language versions. For the Spanish edition, titled Estrellados, Keaton spoke his dialogue phonetically, but the 1931 release in France had French-language intertitles replacing the English dialogue.

MGM spent almost $500,000 on the production of Free and Easy.

Reception
Contemporary reviews were mixed, with The New York Times reviewer Mordaunt Hall stating that Keaton's "audible performance is just as funny as his antics in mute offerings," while Robert E. Sherwood in The Film Daily wrote that, "Buster Keaton, trying to imitate a standard musical comedy clown, is no longer Buster Keaton and no longer funny." Nonetheless, Free and Easy was a bigger hit than the majority of Keaton's silent films.

Modern reviews are less enthusiastic, with critic John J. Puccio stating that the film "contains far too much talk and far too few visual gags."

Re-makes
Free and Easy was re-made twice, first in 1937 as Pick a Star, and later as Abbott and Costello in Hollywood in 1945.

See also
Lionel Barrymore filmography

References
Notes

External links

 Free and Easy at the International Buster Keaton Society

1930 films
1930 comedy films
American black-and-white films
1930s English-language films
Films about actors
Films about Hollywood, Los Angeles
Films directed by Edward Sedgwick
Metro-Goldwyn-Mayer films
American multilingual films
American comedy films
1930 multilingual films
1930s American films
Films with screenplays by Richard Schayer